Nes is a municipality in Akershus in Viken county, Norway.  It is part of the traditional region of Romerike.  The administrative centre of the municipality is the village of Årnes.

Name
The municipality (originally the parish) is named after the old Nes farm (Old Norse: Nes which means "headland"), since the first church was built here. The actual nes is the headland made by the two great rivers Glomma and Vorma, which have their meeting point just south of the farm.  Prior to 1889, the name was spelled "Næs".

Coat-of-arms
The coat-of-arms is from modern times.  They were granted in 1988.  The arms show three yellow logs (to represent forestry) on a green background (to symbolize youth and hope). The position of the logs represents the meeting of the rivers Glomma and Vorma, creating the headland of Nes.

History
The parish of Næs was established as a municipality of its own on 1 January 1838 (see formannskapsdistrikt).

Nes Church Ruins
Nes Church ruins (Nes kirkeruin) are one of Norway's best preserved church ruins. The church which dated from ca 1100 was designed in Romanesque style and was extended into a cruciform church in 1697. The old medieval stone  was located near the juncture of two rivers; Glomma and Vorma. The church suffered fire damage in 1854. After the fire the walls were preserved  as ruins. The new Nes Church was completed in 1860.

Geography
The municipality borders Eidsvoll, Ullensaker, Sørum, and Aurskog-Høland in Akershus county and Eidskog, Sør-Odal, and Nord-Odal in Hedmark county.

Nes includes many natural attractions, such as parts of the river Glomma, as well as 168 lakes. Elk, beaver, wolf, and lynx can be found here. Hunting and sportfishing are very prevalent.

Eight hundred farms make the area one of the largest producers of wheat in the country.

Villages
Årnes
Vormsund
Skogrand
Aulifeltet
Neskollen
Fenstad
Brårud
Fjellfoten
Haga

Demography

Notable people 

 Gudbrand Bøhn (1839 in Nes – 1906) a violinist, concertmaster and music teacher
 Ivar Throndsen (1853 in Nes – 1932) an engraver, worked at the Royal Mint in Kongsberg
 Harald Otto (1865 in Nes – 1928) a Norwegian actor and theater director
 Åsmund Esval (1889 in Nes – 1971) a Norwegian landscape painter
 Odd Fossengen (1945 in Nes – 2017) a Norwegian international motorcycle speedway rider
 Åslaug Haga (born 1959 in Nes) diplomat, politician and international civil servant

Sport 
 John Møller (1866 in Nes – 1935) a rifle shooter, team silver medallist at the 1906 Summer Olympics
 Geir Frigård (born 1970 in Vormsund) a former professional footballer with 339 club caps and 5 for Norway
 twins Lotta Udnes Weng & Tiril Udnes Weng (born 1996 in Nes) Norwegian cross-country skiers

References

External links

Municipal fact sheet from Statistics Norway

Tourist information
Raumnes: newspaper for Nes på Romerike 

Municipalities of Akershus
Municipalities of Viken (county)